dr5, or dr5 Chrome, is a reversal black and white process, through which most kinds of black-and-white negative films produce transparencies (slides). The dr5 process is a chemical reversal process, rather than the standard, light-based reversal for black and white transparency (slide). It was developed by photographer and photographic chemist David Wood. He stated that dr5 gives the photographer the ability to have a B&W darkroom in-camera, enabling a final thought out exposure, the original as seen or envisioned by the artist.

History 

The "dr5 process" is the fifth incarnation of the process, derived by experimentation by Wood from 1989 through 1991. Though reversal film processing was well known throughout photographic history, the dr5 process is proprietary. Privately performing the process alone until 1998, Wood afterward briefly teamed with A&I Color Lab in Los Angeles CA, via their affiliate lab AIM.

The dr5 process won best new product in 1999 at the '99 Photo Expo-Plus Expo Review.

In August 2001, Wood opened an independent lab, that used a processor made for dr5 specifications by Tecnolab in Italy.

References

External links
B&W Slides from Tri-X? You Betcha!, B&H review by Allan Weitz
David Wood, DR5 Processing, Rewind Photo in Australia, Community board
Film Shooters Collective review by Mark Schlocker
An Interview with Jason Lee about dr5, AllFormat Collective
A Traditional Photographer Merges Film and Digital Techniques: The Art and Craft of Richard Lohmann. Steve Bedell, Shutterbug, February 2006. Profile of photographer Richard Lohmann, Photographic Professor at San Mateo, CA using dr5.
dr5 Labs: Renewing The Black And White Lease. George Schaub, Shutterbug, February 2005.
'Doctor' Wood's Amazing .dr5 Black and White Transparencies. Joseph Van Os Photo Safaris, 2008.
dr5 / negative development grain comparisons

Photographic film processes
Black-and-white media